Carmelo Delgado Delgado (April 20, 1913 – April 29, 1937) was a leader of the Puerto Rican Nationalist Party. Delgado joined the Abraham Lincoln International Brigade and fought against the Spanish Nationalists in the Spanish Civil War. Delgado Delgado, a Puerto Rican by birth and national origin, is thought to be the first U.S. citizen to die in Spain's civil war.

Early years
Delgado was one of three siblings born to Eladio Delgado Berrios and Flora Delgado Gonzalez in the town of Guayama, Puerto Rico. He spent his early childhood on his parents' farm located in Guamani barrio and later moved with his family to the Calle (Street) Concordia esquina (Corner) Hostos in the town of Guayama. There he received his primary and secondary education.

Puerto Rican Nationalist
Delgado enrolled and was accepted in the University of Puerto Rico, where he befriended Puerto Rican poet and Nationalist Juan Antonio Corretjer. Delgado became a pro-independence political activist and follower of Dr. Pedro Albizu Campos. He was a member of the Cadets of the Republic (Cadetes de la República), the youth organization of the Puerto Rican Nationalist Party. After earning his bachelor's degree, he moved to Spain in pursuit of a law degree.

Spanish Civil War
On September 22, 1935, Delgado left for Spain and upon his arrival enrolled in the Central University of Madrid. He arrived in a Spain which was about to be confronted with a civil war between the loyalists and rebels. Delgado became politically active as a supporter of the Spanish Second Republic and upon the outbreak of the Spanish Civil War, joined the Abraham Lincoln International Brigade. The Abraham Lincoln Brigade was made up mostly of volunteers from the United States, which included Puerto Ricans and Cubans who served in the Spanish Civil War in the International Brigades. Delgado wrote to his friend, Puerto Rican Nationalist leader Carlos Carrera Benítez, the following letter:

Delgado was involved in the Battle of Madrid, when he became unaware that his troops were ordered to retreat. He was captured and sent to Valladolid, where he faced a military war tribune. The United States Embassy offered to help, however Delgado refused their offer. According to Corretjer: "Carmelo Delgado preferred to die before a firing squad than to beg for his live to the "Yankee".

Aftermath
Carmelo Delgado Delgado was executed on April 29, 1937 by firing squad, becoming one of the first United States citizens that died in that conflict. The news of his execution reached Puerto Rico and was posted on the front page of El Mundo newspaper on July 25, 1937 as "Se confirma la ejecución del joven Carmelo Delgado" (The execution of Carmelo Delgado, a young man, has been confirmed).

Military decoration
Carmelo Delgado Delgado was awarded the following:

   Spanish Civil War Medal of the International Brigades

See also

 List of Puerto Ricans
 List of Puerto Rican military personnel
 Puerto Rican Nationalist Party
 Cadets of the Republic

Notes

References

Further reading
 Delgado Cintrón, Carmelo (Dr.); "Carmelo Delgado Delgado" - Article by Carmelo Delgado Cintrón, Social History historian and legal historian of Puerto Rico
 "Galeria de heroes de Puerto Rico" (Spanish); by Jose Morales-Dorta (Author); Publisher: Editorial Plaza Mayor (1997); 

1913 births
1937 deaths
People from Guayama, Puerto Rico
Puerto Rican people of Spanish descent
Members of the Puerto Rican Nationalist Party
Puerto Rican Army personnel
Abraham Lincoln Brigade members
Military personnel killed in the Spanish Civil War
Puerto Rican military officers
Puerto Rican independence activists
People executed by Francoist Spain
People executed by Spain by firing squad